The A1 Team Japan was the Japanese team of A1 Grand Prix, an international racing series. It no longer competes as the league was forced into bankruptcy.

Owners
A1 Team Japan current seat holder is unknown, held by a corporate conglomeration. The team was managed by Carlin Motorsport.

Drivers
The main driver for the Japanese team was Ryo Fukuda, with Hideki Noda as a test/second driver. Hayanari Shimoda is the team's third driver.

Complete A1 Grand Prix results
(key), "spr" indicate a Sprint Race, "fea" indicate a Main Race.

External links
A1gp.com Official A1 Grand Prix Web Site

Japan A1 team
National sports teams of Japan
Japanese auto racing teams
Auto racing teams established in 2005
Auto racing teams disestablished in 2006